The Bucyrus MT6300AC is an off-highway, ultra class, two-axle, diesel/AC electric powertrain haul truck designed and manufactured by Bucyrus International Inc. in the United States. The closest analogs are Liebherr T 282B, Caterpillar 797F, which can carry the same weight, and BelAZ 75710 with 450 tons payload capacity.

On February 19, 2010, the Terex Unit Rig MT6300AC was re-branded as the Bucyrus MT6300AC when Bucyrus International Inc. acquired the mining equipment division of Terex Corporation.

On July 8, 2011, Bucyrus became a division of Caterpillar.  The Bucyrus AC line became known as Caterpillar's UnitRig line.

Public debut

Terex Corporation's Terex Mining division debuted the Terex Unit Rig MT6300AC at MINExpo International in September, 2008.

Re-branding

On February 19, 2010, the Terex Unit Rig MT6300AC was re-branded as the Bucyrus MT6300AC when Bucyrus International Inc. acquired the mining equipment division of Terex Corporation.

Powertrain

The MT6300AC employs a diesel/AC electric powertrain. A  MTU/DDC C3 Series 20V4000 four-stroke diesel engine powers an AC electric alternator which provides power to a triple reduction geared electric motor located at each side of the rear axle.

Specifications

See also
 Haul truck

Notes

References

External links 
MT6300AC Electric Drive Truck product brochure (PDF) - WebCite archive
Terex MT6300 Mining Truck - YouTube
Bucyrus Mining Trucks - Bucyrus International Inc.

Haul trucks